Promicromonospora xylanilytica is a Gram-positive, non-spore-forming and xylan-degrading bacterium from the genus Promicromonospora which has been isolated from the leaves of the plant Maytenus austroyunnanensis in Xishuangbanna, China.

References

Further reading

External links
Type strain of Promicromonospora xylanilytica at BacDive -  the Bacterial Diversity Metadatabase

Micrococcales
Bacteria described in 2012